5300 may refer to:

In general
 A.D. 5300, a year in the 6th millennium CE
 5300 BC, a year in the 6th millennium BCE
 5300, a number in the 5000 (number) range

Electronics and computing
 Nokia 5300, a cellphone
 PowerBook 5300, a portable computer
 Power Macintosh 5300, a personal computer

Rail
 Hankyu 5300 series, an electric multiple unit train series
 Meitetsu 5300 series, an electric multiple unit train series
 Toei 5300 series, an electric multiple unit train series
 NS 5300 class locomotive
 Baltimore and Ohio 5300 (built 1927), a particular steam locomotive engine named "President Washington"

Other uses
 5300 Sats, an asteroid in the Asteroid Belt, the 5300th asteroid registered
 5300 (District of Kuçovë), one of the postal codes in Albania
 Building 5300, Oak Ridge National Laboratory, Oak Ridge, Tennessee, USA
 Bizzarrini 5300 Spyder S.I., a sports car

See also